Hypseleotris cyprinoides, the tropical carp-gudgeon or tropical bitterling-gudgeon, is a species of fish in the family Eleotridae found in fresh, brackish, and marine coastal waters from Africa through southern Asia to the Pacific Islands. It has been extirpated from the Indian Ocean island of Réunion,

References

External links
 Photograph of male
 Photograph of female

cyprinoides
Freshwater fish of South Africa
Fishkeeping
Taxonomy articles created by Polbot
Fish described in 1837